Egypt competed at the 1924 Summer Olympics in Paris, France. 24 competitors, all men, took part in 12 events in 9 sports.

Athletics

A single athlete represented Egypt in 1924. It was the nation's second appearance in the sport as well as the Games.

Ranks given are within the heat.

Boxing 

A single boxer, Michel Haddad, represented Egypt at the 1924 Games. It was the nation's debut in the sport. Haddad lost his only bout.

Cycling

Three cyclists represented Egypt in 1924. It was the nation's debut in the sport.

Road cycling

Ranks given are within the heat.

Track cycling

Ranks given are within the heat.

Fencing

Three fencers, all men, represented Egypt in 1924. It was the nation's second appearance in the sport.

 Men

Ranks given are within the pool.

Football

Egypt competed in the Olympic football tournament for the second time in 1924. The Egyptian side was on the winning side of one of the two major second-round upsets, beating Hungary three to nil.

 Round 1 Bye

 Round 2

 Quarterfinals

Final rank 5th place

Shooting

A single sport shooter represented Egypt in 1924. It was the nation's debut in the sport. Agathon placed ninth in his only event, the rapid fire pistol.

Weightlifting

Wrestling

Greco-Roman

 Men's

References

External links
Official Olympic Reports

Nations at the 1924 Summer Olympics
1924
Olympics